Arzignano is an industrial town and comune in the Province of Vicenza in Veneto, Italy.

History
In 1413, during a campaign of King Sigismund of Hungary against the Republic of Venice, its castle was besieged by Hungarian troops under Pippo Spano.

Main sights
Sanctuary of Santa Maria delle Grazie, built after the plague of 1485.
Church of Sant'Agata di Tezze, originating in the early 15th century in the site of a pre-existing chapel.

Sport

The main club of the city, Arzignano Valchiampo, currently plays in Serie C.

Notable people
 Achille Beltrame, painter and illustrator
 Marzia Kjellberg, former YouTube personality, fashion designer, and wife of PewDiePie
 Armando Castagna, former international motorcycle speedway rider
 Filippo Dani, footballer for Arzignano Valchiampo on loan from Juventus
 Angelo Furlan, former professional road bicycle racer
 Alessandra Galiotto, Olympian and sprint canoer
 Luca Ghiotto, racing driver currently competing in the GT World Challenge Europe
 Giuseppe Marzotto, former international motorcycle speedway rider
 Stefano Mazzocco, footballer for Pavia
 Paolo Negro, retired football player and manager
 Mattia Sandrini, footballer for Real Vicenza on loan from Parma
 Andrea Tecchio, footballer for Rovigo Calcio on loan from L.R. Vicenza Virtus
 Delfo Zorzi, Italian-born Japanese neo-fascist and acquitted suspect in Piazza Fontana bombing

References

Cities and towns in Veneto